Latendorf is a municipality in the district of Segeberg, in Schleswig-Holstein, Germany.

Notable people
Latendorf is the birthplace of Henry William Heisch, a Private who served in the United States Marine Corps aboard the cruiser USS Newark (C-1) during the Boxer Rebellion and was awarded the Medal of Honor for actions in Tientsin, China on June 20, 1900.

References

Municipalities in Schleswig-Holstein
Segeberg